The Château de Coulans is an 18th-century château in Coulans-sur-Gée, Sarthe, France. It has been partially listed as an official historical monument by the French Ministry of Culture since 1980.

References

Châteaux in Sarthe
Monuments historiques of Pays de la Loire